San Rafael may refer to:

Places

Argentina 
 San Rafael, Mendoza
 San Rafael Department, Mendoza

Bolivia 
 San Rafael de Velasco, capital of San Rafael Municipality
 San Rafael Municipality, Santa Cruz

Chile 
 San Rafael, Chile, Maule Region
 Laguna San Rafael National Park, Aysén Region
 San Rafael Glacier
 San Rafael Lake

Colombia 
 San Rafael, Antioquia

Costa Rica 
 San Rafael (canton), Heredia
 San Rafael de Guatuso, Guatuso, Alajuela
 San Rafael District, Alajuela, Alajuela
 San Rafael District, San Rafael, Heredia
 San Rafael District, San Ramón, Alajuela

Dominican Republic 
 San Rafael del Yuma

Ecuador 
 San Rafael Falls

El Salvador 
 San Rafael, Chalatenango 
 San Rafael Cedros, Cuscatlán
 San Rafael Obrajuelo, La Paz
 San Rafael, San Miguel

Guatemala 
 San Rafael Las Flores, Santa Rosa
 San Rafael La Independencia, Huehuetenango
 San Rafael Petzal, Huehuetenango
 San Rafael Pie de la Cuesta, San Marcos

Honduras 
 San Rafael, Lempira

Mexico 
 San Rafael, Sinaloa
 San Rafael, Veracruz

Nicaragua 
 San Rafael del Norte, Jinotega
 San Rafael del Sur, Managua

Paraguay 
 San Rafael (Asunción), a neighbourhood
 San Rafael del Paraná, Itapúa

Peru 
 San Rafael District, Ambo

Philippines 
 San Rafael, Bulacan
 San Rafael, Iloilo
 San Rafael, Tarlac City, Tarlac
 San Rafael, a barangay in San Felipe, Zambales

Spain 
 San Rafael del Río, Castellón
 San Rafael, Ibiza

United States 
 San Rafael, Arizona
 San Rafael, California
 San Rafael, New Mexico
 San Rafael Hills, in Los Angeles County, California
 San Rafael Mountains, in Santa Barbara County, California
 San Rafael River, in Utah
 San Rafael Valley, in Arizona

Venezuela 
 San Rafael de Onoto, Portuguesa
 San Rafael del Piñal, Táchira
 San Rafael de Carvajal, Trujillo
 San Rafael del Moján, Zulia

Geology 
 San Rafael Block, in Argentina
 San Rafael Formation, in Mexico
 San Rafael Group, in the United States
 San Rafael orogeny, in Argentina and Chile
 San Rafael Swell, in Utah

Transport 
 San Rafael (steamboat)
 San Rafael Airport (disambiguation)
 San Rafael railway station, in Tlalnepantla, Mexico
 San Rafael Transit Center, in Richmond, California

Other uses
 Battle of San Rafael, part of the Philippine Revolution
 Mission San Rafael Arcángel, a Spanish mission in California
 Roman Catholic Diocese of San Rafael, in Argentina

See also 
 Rafael (disambiguation)
 Raphael (disambiguation)
 Saint Raphael (disambiguation)